We Brave Bee Stings and All is the debut studio album by alternative folk band Thao with the Get Down Stay Down. It was released in January 2008. The album was #10 on emusic.com's list of the best albums of 2008, where it was described as "a friendly and catchy pop record" and "an astonishing mash of herky-jerked D.C. punk and Olympia-style folk"

Track listing
 "Beat (Health, Life and Fire)" – 2:31
 "Bag of Hammers" – 2:49
 "Big Kid Table" – 3:48
 "Swimming Pools" – 2:08
 "Geography" (feat. Laura Veirs) – 3:14
 "Feet Asleep" – 3:40
 "Yes, So On and So On" – 2:52
 "Fear and Convenience" – 4:03
 "Violet" – 2:44
 "Travel" – 1:46
 "We Go" – 2:34

References

External links
 Thao & The Get down Stay Down official website

2008 debut albums

Thao & the Get Down Stay Down albums
Kill Rock Stars albums